Maid in Paris (French: Paris canaille) is a 1956 French comedy film directed by Pierre Gaspard-Huit and starring Dany Robin, Daniel Gélin and Tilda Thamar. The screenplay concerns a young woman from the countryside who visits Paris and falls in love with a police officer there.

The film's sets were designed by the art director Robert Hubert.

Cast
 Dany Robin as Penny Benson
 Daniel Gélin as Antoine du Merlet
 Tilda Thamar as Gloria Benson
 Mary Marquet as Mme. Bernemal
 Marie Daëms as Claude
 Maryse Martin as Germaine
 François Guérin as Jean-Pierre
 Robert Murzeau as Le monsieur fauché
 Micheline Gary as Une pensionnaire
 Michel Etcheverry as Le commissaire des mineurs
 Roger Pierre as Gérard Destremeaux, le gigolo
 Darry Cowl as Daniel, le casseur d'assiettes
 Yoko Tani as Une élève
 Sophie Daumier as Une élève
 Renée Passeur as La dame au gigolo
 Roger Dumas as Un jeune dragueur au jardin
 Jackie Sardou

References

Bibliography
 Rège, Philippe . Encyclopedia of French Film Directors, Volume 1. Scarecrow Press, 2009.

External links

A still from the film appeared in the New York Times on July 7, 1957

1956 films
1956 romantic comedy films
Films directed by Pierre Gaspard-Huit
Films set in Paris
French romantic comedy films
1950s English-language films
1950s French films
French black-and-white films